Caer (or ) is a placename element in Welsh meaning "stronghold", "fortress", or "citadel", roughly equivalent to an Old English suffix (-ceaster) now variously written as , , and .

In modern Welsh orthography, caer is usually written as a prefix, although it was formerly—particularly in Latin—written as a separate word. The Breton equivalent is kêr, which is present in many Breton placenames as the prefix Ker-.

Etymology

The term is thought to have derived from the Brittonic *kagro- and to be cognate with cae ("field, enclosed piece of land").<ref>Geiriadur Prifysgol Cymru, vol. 1, p. 384.</ref> Although stone castles were largely introduced to Wales by the invading Normans, "caer" was and remains used to describe the settlements around some of them as well.

Note that the term is not believed to be related to the Irish cathair ("city"), which is instead derived from Proto-Celtic *katrixs, *catarax ("fortification").

 Britain 
Gildas's account of the Saxon invasions of Britain claimed that there were 28 fortified Roman cities on the island, without listing them. The History of the Britons traditionally attributed to Nennius includes a list of the 28, all of which are called "caer". Controversy exists over whether this list includes only Roman cities or a mixture of Roman cities and non-Roman settlements. Some of the place names that have been proposed include:

 Cair Brithon. ("Fort of the Britons": Dumbarton in Strathclyde)
 Cair Caratauc. ("Fort Rampart": Salisbury? Sellack?)
 Cair Ceint. ("Fort Kent": Canterbury)
 Cair Celemion. (Camalet? Silchester?)
 Cair Colun. ("Fort Colonia": Colchester?)
 Cair Custoeint. ("Fort Constantius or Constantine": Caernarfon; or  a Devonian hillfort)
 Cair Daun. ("Fort Don": Doncaster)
 Cair Draitou. (Drayton? Dunster?)
 Cair Ebrauc. ("Fort York": York)
 Cair Grauth. ("Fort Granta": Cambridge)
 Cair Guent. ("Fort Venta": Caerwent or Winchester)
 Cair Guinntguic. ("Fort Venta": Winchester? Norwich or Winwick?)
 Cair Guiragon. ("Fort Weorgoran": Worcester)
 Cair Guorthigirn. ("Fort Vortigern": Little Doward? Carmarthen?)
 Cair Guricon. (Warwick? Wroxeter?)
 Cair Legeion Guar Usic. ("Fort Legion on the Usk": Caerleon-upon-Usk)
 Cair Legion. ("Fort Legion": Chester)
 Cair Lerion. ("Fort Leir": Leicester)
 Cair Ligualid. ("Fort Luguwalos": Carlisle)
 Cair Luit Coyt. ("Fort Grey Wood": Wall)
 Cair Lundem. ("Fort Londinium": London)
 Cair Maunguid. (Manchester?)
 Cair Meguaid. ("Fort Mediolanum": Meifod? Llanfyllin? Caersws? in Powys)
 Cair Mincip.
 Cair 'Pensa vel Coyt'. ("Fort Penselwood": Exeter? Ilchester?)
 Cair Peris. (Porchester? Builth Wells?)
 Cair Segeint. ("Fort Seiont": Caernarfon; or  Silchester)
 Cair Urnarc. (Wroxeter? Dorchester?)

 Wales 

The element caer, sometimes anglicized as car, is found in several place-names in Wales such as:

 Caerau, Glamorgan ("Forts")
 Caereinion, Montgomeryshire ("Fort on the Einion")
 Caerfallwch, Flintshire ("Afallach's fort")
 Caerfarchell, Pembrokeshire ("Marchell's fort")
 Caergeiliog, Angelsey ("Fort of the cockrell")
 Caergwrle, Flintshire ("Fort of the crane-wood")
 Caerleon, Glamorgan ("Fort Legion")
 Caernarfon, Caernarfonsire ("Fort Arfon")
 Caerphilly, Glamorgan ("Fort Ffili")
 Caerrhun, Caernarfonshire ("Fort of Rhun")
 Caersws, Montgomeryshire ("Susan's fort")
 Caerwent, Monmouthshire ("Fort Venta")
 Cardiff, Glamorgan ("Fort Taf")
 Carew, Pembrokeshire
 Gaerwen, Anglesey (Caerwen, "white fort")
 Holyhead, Anglesey ("Fort Cybi")

 England 
The Cumbric language was spoken in Northern England until the Medieval era in which the element caer ("fort") was used in naming places. It also appears in Cornish place-names as Ker-.
 Caermote, Cumberland (Caermollt, "Fort of the wether")
 Cardew, Cumberland (Caerdu, "Black fort")
 Cardunneth, Cumberland. (Caerdunawd, "Dünǭd's fort")
 Cardurnock, Cumberland (Caerdwrnog, "Fort of the fist-sized stones")
 Cargo, Cumberland (Caergoll, "Fort of hazel")
 Carhullan, Westmorland ("Fort of Holland")
 Carrick, Northumberland (Caerwig, "vicus fort")
 Carlatton, Cumberland ("Fort of the leek enclosure")
 Carlisle, Cumberland ("Fort Luguwalos")
 Carmolt, Cumberland (Caermollt, "Fort of the wether")
 Carrycoats, Northumberland ("Fort of the wood")
 Carvoran, Northumberland ("Fort of the Morini")
 Kerrier, CornwallCaer is also found in Welsh exonyms for English cities.
 Cambridge ("Fort Granta")
 Canterbury ("Fort Kent")
 Chester ("Fort")
 Chichester ( )
 Durham ("Fort of the Wear")
 Gloucester ( )
 Exeter ("Fort Usk")
 Lancaster ( )
 Leicester ("Fort Leir")
 Lichfield ("Fort Grey Wood")
 Salisbury ( )
 Winchester ( )
 Worcester ( )

 Scotland 
Cumbric and Pictish were Brittonic languages spoken in Scotland until around the 12th century, and caer ("fort") was a place-naming element in both languages.
Caerketton, Midlothian ("Fort of Catel") 
Caerlanrig, Roxburghshire ("Fort Clearing")
Caerlaverock, Dumfriesshire ("Fort of Llywarch") 
Carcluie, Ayrshire ("Fort of Clewein") 
Carden, Fife. Formerly Cardenni 
Cardonald, Renfrewshire ("Duμnwal's fort") 
Carleith, Dunbartonshire 
Carmichael, Lanarkshire ("Fort of Saint Michael")
Carmuirs, Stirlingshire 
Carmurie, Fife ("Fort of the Sea")
Carmyllie, Angus ("Fort of the warrior") 
Carpow, Perthshire ("Fort of the sluggish stream")
Carriden, West Lothian ("Fort Eidyn")
Carruthers, Dumfriesshire ("Fort of Rhodri")
Carstairs, Lanarkshire ("Fort of the Tarras") 
Crail, Fife ("Fort of the rock")
Cramond, Midlothian ("Fort Almond")
Kair, Kincardineshire ("Fort") 
Keir, Aberdeenshire ("Fort")
Keir, Dumfries-shire ("Fort") 
Keir, Stirlingshire ("Fort")
Keirhill, West Lothian 
Keirs, Ayrshire 
Kirkbuddo, Angus ("Fort of Buiteoc") 
Kirkcaldy, Fife ("place of the hard fort" or "place of Caled’s fort")
Kirkintilloch, Dunbartonshire. Formerly Caerpentaloch In fiction 
 Caer Bronach and Caer Oswin from Dragon Age: Inquisition Caer Cadarn from The Warlord Chronicles - set in Cadbury Castle, Somerset according to the author's note in The Winter King.
 Caer Dallben from The Chronicles of Prydain series
 Caer Llyr and Caer Secaire from The Dark World Caer Siorai from Death's Gambit Cair Andros from The Lord of the Rings Cair Paravel from The Chronicles of Narnia Kaer Morhen from The Witcher series
 Caer Darrow from World of Warcraft Caer Bocram from Tales of Vesperia Kêr-Is (Ys), of Breton legend
Caer Lyon from "Wizard101"
 The Rabbit of Caerbannog from Monty Python and the Holy Grail''.

See also 
 Gaer (disambiguation)
 Welsh toponymy

References 

Place name element etymologies
Welsh toponymy
Prefixes
English suffixes